Bauera sessiliflora, also known as Grampians bauera, is a species of flowering plant in the family Cunoniaceae and is endemic to the Grampians region in Victoria, Australia. It is a scrambling shrub with wiry branches, trifoliate leaves and pink or magenta flowers.

Description
Flowering mostly occurs from September to December.

Taxonomy
Bauera sessiliflora was first formally described in 1855 by Victorian Government Botanist Ferdinand von Mueller in his book Definitions of rare or hitherto undescribed Australian plants, based on plant material collected at Mount William in the Grampians National Park.

Distribution and habitat
Grampians bauera is endemic to the Grampians where it grows in damp locations near streams and rocky gullies.

Use in horticulture
Bauera sessiliflora is not common in gardens, but can be grown in moist, well-drained soil.

References

Costermans L. (1981) Native Trees and Shrubs of South Eastern Australia, Rigby, Australia.

Flora of Victoria (Australia)
Cunoniaceae
Oxalidales of Australia
Grampians (region)
Grampians (national park)
Taxa named by Ferdinand von Mueller
Plants described in 1855